Waldenberger is a surname. Notable people with the surname include:

Franz Waldenberger, German professor of Japanese economy
Holger Waldenberger (born 1967), German professional quiz player